The Beatniks is a 1960 American crime film in the teensploitation genre directed by Paul Frees. It was also featured on the movie-mocking program Mystery Science Theater 3000.

Plot

Eddy Crane is the leader of a gang that robs small businesses for petty cash. At one point, his gang accosts the broken-down car of a music business executive, Harry Bayliss. Afterward Bayliss wishes to call a tow truck, so he goes into the diner where Eddy's gang is celebrating. Bayliss overhears Eddy singing to the jukebox and offers him a chance to audition for his variety program. Eddy accepts, passes his audition, and is given a spot on television. Eddy sings a two-minute song that is apparently stupendously successful, with Bayliss calling Eddy an "overnight sensation" and prophesying an astounding rise to fame, complete with a hit record, "a guest spot on every top show," and eventually culminating with "The Eddy Crane Show." Atop Eddy's newfound success, he also immediately begins making advances at Bayliss's secretary, Helen Tracy, in preference over his long-suffering girlfriend, Iris.

The specter of Eddy's stardom raises dissension among his gang, who wish either to accompany him unquestionably on his ascent, or to hold him back in their ranks. Iris is also jealous of Helen, with whom Eddy has been carrying on an affair. Helen eventually professes her love for Eddy. But one of Eddy's gang members, Moon, kills a fat barkeep, threatening to drag Eddy down by association. Moon runs from the police, but is tracked down by Eddy, who delivers him for arrest. With this he also definitively separates himself from the rest of his gang and from Iris, but also destroys his prospects for a career as a singer with his own arrest.

Cast

Production
The film was shot in 1958 under the title of Sideburns and Sympathy.  In 1958 it was announced the film was to have been produced by Elmer Carl Rhodan Jr. (1922-1959). In addition to producing teen exploitation films such as Daddy-O, The Cool and the Crazy (both 1958), The Delinquents (1957) and Corn's-A-Poppin' (1956), Rhodan was the son of the owner of the Midwestern Commonwealth Theatre chain, but died in 1959.

Soundtrack
Songs for The Beatniks were written by songwriter Eddie Brandt and director Paul Frees.

Notes

External links

1960 films
1960 crime films
1960s English-language films
American black-and-white films
Teensploitation
Films directed by Paul Frees